The Cocklemore Brook is a short tributary of the Bristol Avon, some  long.  It rises near Studley in Wiltshire, England, and flows in a north and then westerly direction, draining the Pewsham area before passing underneath the former Wilts & Berks Canal and then joining the Bristol Avon near Lackham House, now home to Lackham College. An alternate name of Pewe Brook is recorded in the 14th century.

References

Rivers of Wiltshire
1Cocklemore